The Drakeia  massacre refers to the mass execution of 115 men by SS soldiers in the village of Drakeia, located on Mount Pelion, in Thessaly, on 18 December 1943. It was part of the multiple Nazi reprisals against the Greek Resistance  in occupied Greece. 

A wake in memory of the victims is held in the area every year, in the presence of members of the Greek Parliament,  members of the Government of Greece and other dignitaries.

References

Nazi war crimes in Greece
1943 in Greece
Massacres in 1943
Massacres in Greece during World War II
Massacres_of_men
Thessaly in World War II
December 1943 events
Violence against men in Europe
Massacres committed by Nazi Germany